Timur Khabibulin (born 2 August 1995) is an Uzbekistani–Kazakhstani tennis player of Tatar descent.

Khabibulin has a career high ATP singles ranking of 753 achieved on 9 May 2016. He also has a career high doubles ranking of 219 achieved on 9 October 2017. Khabibulin has won 1 ATP Challenger doubles title at the 2016 Astana Challenger Capital Cup.

Tour titles

Doubles

References

External links
 
 

1995 births
Living people
Sportspeople from Tashkent
Tatar sportspeople
Uzbekistani emigrants to Kazakhstan
Uzbekistani people of Tatar descent
Kazakhstani people of Tatar descent
Kazakhstani male tennis players
Uzbekistani male tennis players
Tennis players at the 2018 Asian Games
Asian Games competitors for Kazakhstan
Competitors at the 2019 Summer Universiade